The 2015–16 season was Accrington Stanley's tenth consecutive season in League Two and their 47th year in existence. Along with competing in League Two, the club also participated in the FA Cup, League Cup and League Trophy. The season covers the period from 1 July 2015 to 30 June 2016.

Transfers

Transfers in

Transfers out

Loans in

Loans out

Pre-season friendlies
On 15 May 2015, Accrington Stanley announced their first pre-season friendly against Blackburn Rovers. On 19 May 2015, Accrington Stanley announced they will visit Nelson as part of their pre-season schedule. On 24 May 2015, it was announced Accrington Stanley would visit Colne on 8 July 2015 as part of their pre-season preparations. On 28 May 2015, the club announced their fourth pre-season friendly against AFC Darwen. A day later the club announced Rochdale will visit on 28 July 2015. On 30 May 2015, Accrington Stanley announced they will face Marine on 25 July 2015. A friendly against Burnley was announced on 12 June 2015. On 25 June 2015, Accrington Stanley added a home friendly against Blackpool for pre-season. On 4 July 2015, Stanley announced a pre-season fixture against Scarborough Athletic.

Match details

Football League Two

League table

Football League Two play-offs

FA Cup

League Cup

Football League Trophy

Appearances and goals
Source:
Numbers in parentheses denote appearances as substitute.
Players with names struck through and marked  left the club during the playing season.
Players with names in italics and marked * were on loan from another club with Accrington Stanley.
Players listed with no appearances have been in the matchday squad but only as unused substitutes.
Key to positions: GK – Goalkeeper; DF – Defender; MF – Midfielder; FW – Forward

References

Accrington Stanley
Accrington Stanley F.C. seasons